= Jüdischer Friedhof Köln-Mülheim =

Jewish cemetery in Cologne, Germany

Coordinates: 50°58′28″N 7°01′01″E

Jüdischer Friedhof Köln-Mülheim is a Jewish cemetery in the former city of Mülheim am Rhein, which since 1914 has been incorporated into the district of Cologne, Germany. The cemetery was built in 1774.
